The striped tit-babbler has been split into 2 species:

 Pin-striped tit-babbler (Macronus gularis), also known as yellow-breasted babbler
 Bold-striped tit-babbler (Macronus bornensis)

Birds by common name